Fatima Convent Senior Secondary School is an English Medium co-educational it is a Christian Minority Educational institution. 

It is situated in Mariam Nagar, Ghaziabad, Uttar Pradesh. It is affiliated to CISCE, New Delhi. It is established and administered by the Sisters of the Adoration of the Blessed Sacrament (S.A.B.S) of Christu Jyoti Province in North India and managed through the Registered Society of Adoration sisters for the social welfare.

See also 
 List of Christian schools in India

References

Catholic secondary schools in India
Christian schools in Uttar Pradesh
Private schools in Uttar Pradesh
Schools in Ghaziabad, Uttar Pradesh